The tenth season of Deutschland sucht den Superstar was broadcast on German channel RTL from 5 January to 11 May 2013. The winner received a recording contract with Universal Music Group and €500,000. There were new features in season 10. Participants had to be between 16 and 30 years old and could audition in 30 cities in Germany, Austria and Switzerland. Bill and Tom Kaulitz from Tokio Hotel and Mateo from Culcha Candela became judges. Bruce Darnell and Natalie Horler both left after the completion of season 9. There was a trip to Curaçao during the recall. This is the first season in which three women reached the final four and the second season with a female final 2. After nine years, the show produced a female winner, since Elli Erl in season 2. Beatrice Egli won the show as the second female winner.

Production

Production of season 10 started on 24 August 2012. There was a trip to Curaçao. Participants had to be between 16 and 30 years. They had the opportunity to stop by without an appointment to audition. RTL promised "many new features and a few surprises." Auditions were held in 30 cities in Germany, Austria and Switzerland. The 30 cities are Bern, Zürich, Freiburg, Friedrichshafen, Stuttgart, Mannheim, Saarbrücken, Munich, Vienna, Vösendorf, Salzburg, Regensburg, Erlangen, Freiberg, Hamburg, Hanover, Bremen, Bremerhaven, Fehmarn, Rostock, Cologne, Dortmund, Koblenz, Göttingen, Paderborn, Berlin, Frankfurt, Jena, Magdeburg and Mönchengladbach.

Bruce Darnell and Natalie Horler both left the show after season 9 and were replaced by Bill and Tom Kaulitz and Culcha Candela.

The jury and host

Dieter Bohlen was born on 7 February 1954 in Oldenburg. He has been a judge on DSDS since season 1. He got his first job as a composer and producer in 1979. Bohlen is now considered the most successful German composer and producer. Bohlen and Thomas Anders, as members of Modern Talking, are the only German act with five songs in a row at number 1 on the German singles chart.

Bill Kaulitz was born on 1 September 1989 in Leipzig. He is a member of Tokio Hotel. Season 10 was his first season as a jury member.

Tom Kaulitz is a member of Tokio Hotel. Season 10 was his first season as a jury member.

Mateo of the band Culcha Candela is one of the new jury members for season 10.

Auditions

Auditions were held in 30 cities in Germany, Austria and Switzerland. 32,078 people participated in the auditions, down from 35,401 participants the previous season.

"Recall"

The jury chose 36 participants to go to Curaçao. The jury selected the 20 participants for the live shows. The jury selected eight participants who go directly to the "Mottoshows" (theme shows) and six participants were chosen by the viewers in the first liveshow.

"Mottoshows" (theme shows)

Top 10 - "Mein Superstar" (My Pop Idol)
Original airdate: 16 March 2013

Result for the ninth and tenth place

Normal voting

Group Song: "What a Feeling"
Jury Elimination Forecast: Nora Ferjani, Timo Tiggeler (B. Kaulitz), Timo Tiggeler, Erwin Kintop (T. Kaulitz), - (Bohlen, Mateo)
Jury Favourite Performance: Susan Albers, Ricardo Bielecki (Bohlen) - (T. Kaulitz, Mateo, B. Kaulitz)
Bottom 2: Maurice Glover, Nora Ferjani
Eliminated: Nora Ferjani

Top 9 - "Liebe ist" (Love is)
Original airdate: 23 March 2013

Group Song: "Scream & Shout"
Jury Elimination Forecast: Tim David Weller (Mateo & Tom), Maurice Glover (Bill), Timo Tiggeler (Mateo)
Jury Favourite Performance: 
Bottom 3: Maurice Glover, Tim David Weller, Timo Tiggeler
Eliminated: Maurice Glover

Top 8 - "Let's Party" 
Original airdate: 30 March 2013

Group Song: Medley: "Don't Stop the Party", "Feel This Moment"
Jury Elimination Forecast: Timo Tiggeler or Erwin Kintop (Dieter) 
Jury Favourite Performance: Susan (Mateo); Beatrice, Ricardo, Simone (Tom); Beatrice, Simone, Ricardo (Bill); Beatrice, Lisa, Susan (Dieter)
Bottom 4: Erwin Kintop, Simone Mangiapane, Timo Tiggeler, Lisa Wohlgemuth
Eliminated: Timo Tiggeler

Top 7 - "Typisch Deutsch" (Typically German) 
Original airdate: 6 April 2013

Group Song: Medley: "Lila Wolken", "Ein Stern (...der deinen Namen trägt)"
Jury Elimination Forecast: Simone Mangiapane (Dieter), Erwin Kintop (Bill, Tom & Mateo)
Jury Favourite Performance: 
Bottom 2: Simone Mangiapane & Ricardo Bielecki
Eliminated: Simone Mangiapane

Top 6 - "Solo & Duets"
Original airdate: 13 April 2013

Group Song: None
Jury Elimination Forecast: Tim David Weller
Bottom 2: Susan Albers & Tim David Weller
Eliminated: Tim David Weller

Top 5 - "German vs. English"
Original airdate: 20 April 2013

Group Song: None
Jury Elimination Forecast: Erwin Kintop & Susan Albers
Bottom 2: Erwin Kintop & Lisa Wohlgemuth
Eliminated: Erwin Kintop

Top 4 - "Candidates' Choice"
Original airdate: 27 April 2013

Group Song: "I Love It"
Jury Elimination Forecast: Lisa Wohlgemuth
Bottom 2: Lisa Wohlgemuth & Susan Albers
Eliminated: Susan Albers

Top 3 - Semi-Final
Original airdate: 4 May 2013

Group Song: None
Jury Elimination Forecast: Lisa Wohlgemuth
Bottom 2: Ricardo Bielecki & Lisa Wohlgemuth
Eliminated: Ricardo Bielecki

Top 2 - Final
Original airdate: 11 May 2013

Group Song: "What a Feeling" and "We Have a Dream"
Jury Winner Forecast: Beatrice Egli
Winner: Beatrice Egli
Runner-up: Lisa Wohlgemuth

Elimination chart

On 16 March, the viewers chose the ninth and tenth candidate for the Top 10.

Top 10 candidates

Beatrice Egli
Beatrice Egli was born on 21 June 1988 in Pfäffikon, Switzerland. Mostly a singer of Schlager songs, she became the second female winner of DSDS and the second winner from Switzerland after Luca Hänni the previous season. She received a recording contract from Universal Music Group and a total of €500,000.

Lisa Wohlgemuth
Lisa Wohlgemuth was born on 11 March 1992 in Annaberg-Buchholz. She was voted in the top 10 by the public as the first place. She reached the final with Beatrice. She was beaten by Egli and became the runner-up.

Ricardo Bielecki
Ricardo Bielecki was born on 11 November 1992 in Bochum. He was the male favorite but he was unexpectedly eliminated in the semi-final, finishing in third place. He was the last male contestant.

Susan Albers
Susan Albers was born on 29 December 1983 in Rhede. She was stated as the best singer in the competition but sometime as too perfect. She was eliminated at 27 April and finished at the fourth place.

Erwin Kintop
was born on 28 September 1995 in Rastatt. He was eliminated at 20 April and became the fifth place.

Tim David Weller
Tim David Weller was born on 15 July 1992 in Dillenburg. He was eliminated at 13 April and finished as the sixth place.

Simone Mangiapane
Simone Magiapane was born on 25 April 1985 in Rottenburg. He was voted in the top 10 by the public as the second place. He was eliminated on 6 April and finished at seventh place.

Timo Tiggeler
Timo Tiggler was born on 16 April 1992 in Nettetal. He became the eighth place on 30 March.

Maurice Glover
Maurice Glover was born on 6 October 1986 in Frankenthal. He often was in dispute with Nora Ferjani. He was eliminated at 23 March and ended up as the ninth place.

Nora Ferjani
Nora Ferjani was born on 2 June 1988 in Iserlohn. She was in dispute with Maurice Glover. She was eliminated in the first live show on 16 March and finished in tenth place.

Ratings

Aftermath
The winner of the season, Beatrice Egli, received a recording contract with Universal Music Group and €500,000.

References

Season 10
2013 in German music
2013 German television seasons